Like Gods of the Sun is the fourth album by My Dying Bride released in 1996, and the last album by the band to feature Rick Miah, who left the band in 1997, on drums and Martin Powell on keyboards and violins.

Like its predecessor The Angel and the Dark River this album has completely clean vocals. 

A video was filmed for "For You" and appears on the VHS and DVD of For Darkest Eyes. 

Singer Aaron Stainthorpe has stated many times that this is his favorite MDB album.  The track "A Kiss To Remember" has become a regular in the band's live setlist. 

The song "For My Fallen Angel" is strictly an orchestral composition with sections of violin and synth, and has an extract from a poem called Venus and Adonis by the English poet and playwright William Shakespeare.

The Japanese and limited digipak editions of the album feature the bonus remix "It Will Come (Nightmare Mix)". This track was included on the 2003 reissue of the album alongside an additional remix of the song "Grace Unhearing", credited as "Portishell Mix". The song was thus named as Stainthorpe was at the time a big fan of the British band Portishead. The band would later perform a cover of the Portishead song "Roads" for the Peaceville Records anniversary compilation "Peaceville X". The cover artwork was designed by Andy Green.

In October 2011 it was awarded a gold certification from the Independent Music Companies Association which indicated sales of at least 75,000 copies throughout Europe.

Track listing
 "Like Gods of the Sun" – 5:41
 "The Dark Caress" – 5:58
 "Grace Unhearing" – 7:19
 "A Kiss to Remember" – 7:31
 "All Swept Away" – 4:17
 "For You" – 6:37
 "It Will Come" – 4:27
 "Here in the Throat" – 6:22
 "For My Fallen Angel" – 5:55
 "It Will Come" (Nightmare mix, bonus track on digipak) – 5:36
 "Grace Unhearing" (Portishell mix, bonus track on digipak) – 7:05

Credits
 Aaron Stainthorpe - vocals
 Andrew Craighan - guitar
 Calvin Robertshaw - guitar
 Adrian Jackson - bass
 Martin Powell - violin, keyboard
 Rick Miah - drums

Charts

References

1996 albums
My Dying Bride albums
Peaceville Records albums